Phố Lu – Pom Hán railway (Vietnamese: Đường sắt Phố Lu – Pom Hán) is a railway line serving  the country of Vietnam in Lào Cai province. It can connect to Hanoi–Lào Cai railway.

References 

Rail transport in Vietnam
Transport infrastructure in Vietnam
Lào Cai province